Robert Raymond Scott (July 13, 1915 – December 7, 1941) was a United States Navy sailor who was posthumously awarded the Medal of Honor for his actions during the attack on Pearl Harbor.

Biography
Robert Raymond Scott was born in Massillon, Ohio on July 13, 1915, and enlisted in the United States Navy on April 18, 1938. Machinist's Mate First Class Scott was assigned to  when the Japanese attacked Pearl Harbor on December 7, 1941. The compartment containing the air compressor to which Scott was assigned as his battle station was flooded as a result of a torpedo hit. The remainder of the personnel evacuated the space, but Scott refused to leave, saying words to the effect that "This is my station and I will stay and give them air as long as the guns are going." He was posthumously received the Medal of Honor for his heroism.

Medal of Honor citation
Citation:
For conspicuous devotion to duty, extraordinary courage and complete disregard of his own life, above and beyond the call of duty, during the attack on the Fleet in Pearl Harbor by Japanese forces on 7 December 1941. The compartment, in the U.S.S. California, in which the air compressor, to which Scott was assigned as his battle station, was flooded as the result of a torpedo hit. The remainder of the personnel evacuated that compartment but Scott refused to leave, saying words to the effect "This is my station and I will stay and give them air as long as the guns are going."

Namesake
In 1943, the destroyer escort  was named in his honor.  Scott was also a former student at Ohio State University where the Scott House dormitory is named after him.

See also

List of Medal of Honor recipients

References

External links

Arlington National Cemetery

1915 births
1941 deaths
United States Navy Medal of Honor recipients
Ohio State University alumni
People from Massillon, Ohio
United States Navy sailors
United States Navy personnel killed in World War II
Deaths by Japanese airstrikes during the attack on Pearl Harbor
World War II recipients of the Medal of Honor